Three vessels named HMS Cato or Cato have served the Royal Navy:

 was a 50-gun  that disappeared, presumed to have foundered, circa January 1783.
 was launched on 5 May 1914 by Campbeltown Shipbuilding, Campbeltown for Bristol Steam Navigation. She was requisitioned as a store carrier on 4 November 1914 for the Royal Fleet Auxiliary. She sank on 3 March 1940 after having struck a mine that the German submarine  had laid in the Bristol Channel.
 was a minesweeper launched on 7 September 1942 by Associated Shipbuilders, of Seattle, Washington United States. She was transferred to the Royal Navy on 28 July 1843 under Lend Lease. A German Neger human torpedo sank her on 6 July 1944 off Normandy.

Royal Navy ship names